Lukáš Rosol was the defending champion, but lost to Jerzy Janowicz in the second round. Kevin Anderson won the title defeating in the final Pierre-Hugues Herbert with the score 6–4, 7–5.

Seeds
All seeds receive a bye into the second round.

Draw

Finals

Top half

Section 1

Section 2

Bottom half

Section 3

Section 4

Qualifying

Seeds

Qualifiers

Draw

First qualifier

Second qualifier

Third qualifier

Fourth qualifier

References
Main Draw
Qualifying Draw

2015 ATP World Tour
2015 Singles